Yvette Hafner (born 23 December 1947) is an Austrian former backstroke swimmer. She competed in two events at the 1968 Summer Olympics.

References

External links
 

1947 births
Living people
Austrian female backstroke swimmers
Olympic swimmers of Austria
Swimmers at the 1968 Summer Olympics
Swimmers from Budapest